The Association of the German Farmers Associations (VdB) existed from 1900 to 1934 and was an amalgamation of Christian farmers’ organizations. From 1900 to 1916 it was called "Association of Christian German Farmers Associations" and from 1931 to 1934 it used the name "Association of German Christian Farmers Associations".

History 
The Association of the German Farmers Associations was an umbrella organization of Christian farmers’ organizations which belongs to mostly the Catholic milieu. It united mainly small and medium farmers. The VdB was politically associated with the right-wing of the Centre Party. It was established  as  the "Association of Christian German Farmer Associations" on  November 24, 1900, at a Conference in Frankfurt am Main, by representatives of the Baden, Bavaria, Alsace, Hesse, Nassau, Eastern and West Prussian, Rhenish, Silesian, Trier and Westphalian farmer associations.  The member organizations, especially in the Catholic regions of Western and southern Germany, had been established in the 1880s and 1890s.  In North and Eastern areas farmers were more frequently associated with the Agrarian League and the National Agricultural League. The emergence of these farmer associations can be seen in the broader context of the history of political Catholicism and the Catholic associations of the 19th century.
VdB was a sister organization of the Bavarian People's Party (BVP) which had been established as a splinter of the Center Party in 1919. The Bavarian People's Party was a more politically oriented than the VdB.

The VdB was closely intertwined with the cooperative movement.
The revolution of 1918 allowed the Christian Farmers Associations to recruit many new members and to attract new member organizations because farmers were enthusiastic about demands by the Independent Social Democratic Party of Germany and the majority Social Democratic Party of Germany for economic socialization as well as for the separation of Church and State in cultural and educational policy. At this time the VdB was able to recruit Protestant farmers’ association members.
 
With the agricultural crisis in the second half of the 1920s came fierce controversies within the Association as conservative and Protestant member associations demand a stronger Weimar Republic government and more cooperation with other, usually far more right-oriented,   farmers’ associations. This led to splits and exclusions. The new President Andreas Hermes, long time Minister of Agriculture and food for the Centre Party (Germany) attempted to stop this development, but only partially succeeded. The Westphalian and Rhenish nobility demanded right oriented policy. In February 1929 the "Green Front" was formed by the Association of Christian German Farmers Associations, many of its member organizations, the National Agricultural League, the German Agriculture Council (Deutsche Landwirtschafsrat) and the German Farmers' Party (Deutsche Bauernshaft). This agricultural alliance supported state protectionist agriculture.
Hermes, who resisted the Nazi claim to power in 1933, was arrested. His successor was ready to participate in the NS State. The National Socialist agricultural leader Richard Walther Darré disbanded the Association of German Farmers Associations on January 18, 1934. The member associations had been disbanded the previous year.

President 

 1916-1927 Engelbert of Kerckerinck zur Borg
 1928-1933 Andreas Hermes
 1933-1934 Hermann Lünnick Berghausen

Membership 
 1900 - 210,000
 1901 - 220,000
 1917 - 390,000
 1920 - 450,000

Affiliated Associations 
 Badischer Bauernverein
 Bayerischer Christlicher Bauernverein
 Bayerischer-Patriotischer Bauernverein
 Bezirksbauernschaft Osnabrück
 Christlicher Bauernverein von Mittelfranken
 Christlicher Bauernverein Oberschlesien
 Christlicher Bauernverein für Schwaben und Neuburg
 Christlicher Bauernverein für den Kreis Unterfranken und angrenzende Gebiete
 Eichsfelder Bauernverein
 Emsländischer Bauernverein
 Ermländischer Bauernverein
 Grenzmärkischer Bauernverein
 Hessischer Bauernverein
 Hohenzollerischer Bauernverein
 Kurhessischer Bauernverein
 Landwirtschaftlicher Hauptverband Württemberg und Hohenzollern
 Mittelrheinisch-Nassauischer Bauernverein
 Niederbayerischer Christlicher Bauernverein
 Oberbayerischer Christlicher Bauernverein
 Oberfränkischer Bauernverein
 Oberpfälzischer Christlicher Bauernverein
 Oldenburger Bauernverein
 Pfälzer Bauernverein
 Schlesischer Bauernverein
 Trierischer Bauernverein
 Vereinigung des Rheinischen Bauernvereins und des Rheinischen Landbundes
 Rheinischer Bauernverein
 Westfälischer Bauernverein

Sources 
 Lutz Fahlbusch/Edgar Hartwig, Vereinigung der deutschen Bauernvereine 1900-1934 (VdB), 1900-1916 Vereinigung der christlichen deutschen Bauernvereine, 1931-1934 Vereinigung der deutschen christlichen Bauernvereine, in Dieter Fricke u.a. (ed.), Lexikon zur Parteiengeschichte. Die bürgerlichen und kleinbürgerlichen Parteien und Verbände in Deutschland 1789-1945, Bd. 4, Leipzig/Cologne 1986, S. 344-357.
 Heide Barmeyer: Andreas Hermes und die Organisation der deutschen Landwirtschaft. Christliche Bauernvereine, Reichslandbund, Grüne Front, Reichsnährstand 1928 bis 1933 (Quellen und Forschungen zur Agrargeschichte Bd. 24), Stuttgart
 The Logic of Evil, The Social Origins of the Nazi Party, 1925-1933, William Brustein, Yale University Press, New Haven, CN, 1996

References 

Agriculture in Germany
Agrarian politics
1900 establishments in Germany
1934 disestablishments in Germany